The Eastside Trail is a walking and biking trail stretching northwest to southeast on the Eastside of Atlanta, part of the BeltLine ring of trails and parks. It is lined with numerous notable industrial buildings adapted into restaurants, shops, apartments, condos, and two major food halls and mixed-use developments.

The first  stretch opened in October 2012, from Piedmont Park to the Krog Street Tunnel. It was extended from Krog Street to Kirkwood Avenue in November 2017.  A second extension brought it to Memorial Drive in July 2019.

Route and Points of Interest

Gallery

References

Hiking trails in Atlanta
Adaptive reuse of industrial structures in Atlanta